The following is a list of pipeline accidents in the United States in 1984. It is one of several lists of U.S. pipeline accidents. See also: list of natural gas and oil production accidents in the United States.

Incidents 

This is not a complete list of all pipeline accidents. For natural gas alone, the Pipeline and Hazardous Materials Safety Administration (PHMSA), a United States Department of Transportation agency, has collected data on more than 3,200 accidents deemed serious or significant since 1987.

A "significant incident" results in any of the following consequences:
 Fatality or injury requiring in-patient hospitalization.
 $50,000 or more in total costs, measured in 1984 dollars.
 Liquid releases of five or more barrels (42 US gal/barrel).
 Releases resulting in an unintentional fire or explosion.

PHMSA and the National Transportation Safety Board (NTSB) post-incident data and results of investigations into accidents involving pipelines that carry a variety of products, including natural gas, oil, diesel fuel, gasoline, kerosene, jet fuel, carbon dioxide, and other substances. Occasionally pipelines are re-purposed to carry different products.

The following incidents occurred during 1984:

 1984 On January 15, a leak was discovered in an 8-inch pipeline belonging to Plantation Pipeline in Floyd County, Georgia. Over 300 gallons of gasoline and diesel fuel had spilled into creek. A hayfield nearby was also damaged.
 1984 An 8-inch NGL pipeline near Hurst, Texas, was hit by a front loader, and the escaping gases ignited, causing burns to the equipment operator. (February 28, 1984)
 1984 On March 25, a resident in Missouri City, Texas discovered gasoline leaking from an 8-inch Exxon products pipeline. About 1,000 residents in the area were evacuated for a time, and, some of the gasoline entered a nearby creek.
 1984 On March 27, an 8 inch Dow propane pipeline rupture & following vapor cloud explosion destroyed a home, damaged 4 other buildings, and knocked out power, in Mont Belvieu, Texas
 1984 On April 24, a contractor installing plastic drainage pipe on a farm near Rock Rapids, Iowa hit a petroleum products pipeline, spilling about 4,000 gallons of diesel fuel.
 1984 On June 19, six employees of a contractor working for Washington Gas Light Company (WGL) in Rockville, Maryland, were using mechanical saws to cut a section of 22-inch steel pipeline when residual gas at atmospheric pressure in the isolated section of the pipeline was ignited. A flash fire ensued, and four contractor employees who were operating the saws and a WGL superintendent were burned.
 On August 14, a Plantation Pipeline line leaked near Ladysmith, Virginia, creating a gasoline mist in the area.
 1984 Two natural gas pipelines exploded and burned near Falls City, Texas.
 1984 On September 24, a failed gas main of ABS plastic caused an explosion and fire in Phoenix, Arizona. 5 people died and 7 others injured in the accident. Liquid in the pipe had caused it to break down.
 1984 A tugboat hit and ruptured a gas pipeline on the Houston Ship Channel on October 16. There were no injuries, but the Channel was closed for a time.
 1984 Fast moving water in the Cado Creek near Durant, Oklahoma led to 2 pipelines being ruptured on October 27 & 28. One pipeline was owned by Mobil, the other pipeline was owned by Total S.A. About  of petroleum were spilled.
 1984 A Williams Companies 6 inch pipeline ruptured on November 18 in New Brighton, Minnesota, causing a spill of 40,000 to 50,000 gallons of jet fuel in an industrial area. There were no injuries.
 1984 On November 25, a 30-inch gas transmission pipeline, constructed in 1955 and operating at 1,000 psig pressure, ruptured at a location about three miles (5 km) west of Jackson, Louisiana. The escaping gas was quickly ignited by one of several potential sources of ignition. Within this sparsely populated area, five persons involved with the pipeline construction work were killed, and 23 persons were injured. Additionally, several pieces of construction equipment were damaged extensively. Lack of proper ground support under the pipeline when a nearby section of that pipeline was upgraded and replaced was identified as a factor in the failure.

References

Lists of pipeline accidents in the United States